The Education (Administrative Provisions) Act 1907 (7 Edw. VII) was an Act of Parliament passed by the Liberal government as part of their Liberal reforms package of welfare reforms. The Act set up school medical services run by local government, but the service was not available until 1912, and local governments failed to provide the service.

References 

United Kingdom Acts of Parliament 1907
United Kingdom Education Acts
1907 in education